A W8 engine is an eight-cylinder piston engine with four banks of two cylinders each, arranged in a W configuration.

In practice, the W8 engine is created from two narrow-angle (15 degree) VR4 engines mounted at an angle of 72 degrees from each other on a common crankshaft. Thus, the resulting four banks align to form a "W".

W8 engines are much less common than V8 engines, and the only W8 engine to reach production was manufactured by Volkswagen from 2001–2004.

Volkswagen W8 engine
The sole W8 engine to reach production was the Volkswagen 4-litre W8 engine, which was available in the Volkswagen Passat (B5.5) from September 2001 to September 2004. Production was minimal at only 11,000 units.

Power and torque outputs were lower than competitors V8 engines with similar capacity, however the W8 engine was praised for its smoothness.

Sales of the W8-engined Passat models were poor, and production was discontinued when the next generation of Passat switched from a longitudinal engine to a transverse engine layout, which made packaging of the wide W8 engine difficult. The W8 was effectively replaced by the Volkswagen 3.6-litre VR6 petrol engine.

4.0 WR8 32v 202kW 

The 'W8' badged engine is an eight-cylinder W engine of four banks of two cylinders, formed by joining two 15° VR4 engines, placed on a single crankshaft, with each cylinder 'double-bank' now at a 72° vee-angle.
identification parts code prefix: 07D, ID codes: BDN (09/01-09/04), BDP (05/02-09/04)
engine displacement & engine configuration  72° WR8 engine; bore x stroke: , stroke ratio: 0.93:1 – undersquare/long-stroke, 499.9 cc per cylinder, compression ratio: 10.8:1
cylinder block & crankcase cast aluminium alloy with two-part cast aluminium alloy oil sump; five main bearings; die-forged steel crankshaft with split crankpins; Lanchester principle balance shafts one above the other, counter-rotating at twice the crankshaft speed, symmetric to the middle of the crankshaft, upper one driven by a toothed belt
cylinder heads & valvetrain cast aluminium alloy; four unequal-length valves per cylinder, 32 valves total, low-friction roller finger cam followers with automatic hydraulic valve clearance compensation, simplex roller chain-driven (relay method, using three chains) double overhead camshafts, continuous vane-adjustable variable valve timing for intake and exhaust camshafts with up to 52° variance inlet camshafts and 22° for exhaust camshafts
aspiration hot-film air mass meter, single throttle body with electronically controlled Bosch 'E-Gas' 'drive by wire' throttle butterfly valve, four-part two-channel cast aluminium resonance intake manifold
fuel system, ignition system, engine management two linked common rail fuel distributor rails, multi-point electronic sequential indirect fuel injection with eight intake manifold-sited fuel injectors; centrally positioned NGK longlife spark plugs, mapped direct ignition with eight individual direct-acting single spark coils; Bosch Motronic ME electronic engine control unit (ECU), cylinder-selective knock control via four knock sensors, permanent lambda control; 95 RON/ROZ(91 AKI) EuroSuperPlus (premium) unleaded recommended for maximum performance and fuel economy
exhaust system vacuum-operated secondary air injection pump for direct injection into exhaust ports to assist cold start operation, one cast iron exhaust manifold per cylinder bank with integrated ceramic catalytic converter per cylinder bank, four heated oxygen sensors monitoring pre- and post catalyst exhaust gasses, EU4 compliant
dimensions mass: , length:  length, width: , height: 
DIN-rated motive power & torque output  at 6,000 rpm;  at 2,750 rpm ( MEP); max. engine speed: 6,400 rpm (19.2 m/s)
references

Applications
Volkswagen Passat B5.5 W8 4motion

Awards 
was voted 'best technical innovation', and awarded the "Golden Pegasus" by "Za ruljom" at the Moscow Motor Show

See also
 VR6 engine

References

Piston engine configurations
08